Alberto Altarac is a Bosnian former footballer who played as a midfielder.

Career  
Altarac played in the Yugoslav Second League in 1969 with FK Sloboda Tuzla, and assisted in securing promotion to the Yugoslav First League. He featured in the 1970–71 Yugoslav Cup final, but lost the series to Red Star Belgrade. In 1974, he played in the National Soccer League with Toronto Croatia.

After his football career he worked as an Italian translator.

International career  
Altarac played in 1966 with the Yugoslavia national under-18 football team, and featured in the 1966 UEFA European Under-18 Championship.

References  

Living people
Association football midfielders
Bosnia and Herzegovina footballers
Yugoslav footballers
FK Sloboda Tuzla players
Toronto Croatia players
Yugoslav First League players
Yugoslav Second League players
Canadian National Soccer League players
Year of birth missing (living people)